The  is a museum of modern art in the city of Wakayama, Wakayama Prefecture, Japan. The collection, from its original nucleus of 83 objects, has grown as of 2020 to some 13,000 works, including paintings by Saeki Yūzō, and Mark Rothko.

See also

 Prefectural museum

References

External links
Wakayama Prefectural Museum  
Wakayama Prefectural Museum  

Museums in Wakayama Prefecture
Wakayama (city)
Modern art museums in Japan
Prefectural museums
Museums established in 1963
1963 establishments in Japan